The Tornado Competition was a sailing event on the program at the 1996 Summer Olympics that was held from 22 July to 2 August 1996 in Savannah, Georgia, United States. Points were awarded for placement in each race. Eleven races were scheduled and sailed. Each team had two discards.

Results

Daily standings

Conditions at the Tornado course areas

References

Sources
 
 
 

 
 

Tornado
Tornado (sailboat)
Unisex sailing at the Summer Olympics